The United Arab Emirates is a middle-eastern country, located at the end of the Arabian Peninsula on the Persian Gulf, consisting of seven emirates known as Abu Dhabi, Dubai, Sharjah, Ajman, Umm al-Quwain, Ras al-Khaimah and Fujairah. Each emirate is governed by an emir who jointly forms the Federal Supreme Council (FSC). The Federal System of government includes the Supreme Council, Cabinet, Council of Ministers, parliamentary body, Federal National Council and independent judiciary. The Federal Supreme Council is the highest constitutional authority that has legislative and executive powers with the ability to ratify federal laws, decrees, and plans general policies. Its jurisdictions are derived from French, Roman, Egyptian and Islamic law.

Judicial branch of the government
There are three main branches of the court structure: civil, criminal, and sharia or Islamic (1) (the precepts are set forth in the Quranic verses and example set by the Islamic prophet Muhammad in the Sunnah). (2) Sharia or Islamic courts work alongside the civil and criminal courts. The responsibilities include civil matters between Muslims. Non-Muslims will not appear before a Sharia court in any matter due to the differences in religious beliefs. (3) Sharia or Islamic courts have the exclusive jurisdiction over family disputes divorce, inheritance, child custody, child abuse, and guardianship of minors. (3) However, at the federal level the Sharia court may hear appeals of criminal cases including rape, robbery, and driving under the influence of alcohol. (3)
Dubai is its own sovereign nation with its own federal judicial system with separate court systems that are not subjected to the federal Supreme Court. Dubai's court structure consists of:

 Court of First Instances- hears all claims ranging from commercial matters, debt recovery to maritime disputes.
 Court of Appeal- parties have the right to appeal on factual or legal grounds within thirty days from the judgment date.
 Court of Cessations- (highest court in Dubai) composed of five judges and all judgments are finals and not subject to appeal; only hear disputes on matters of the law and can act as an appellate court with respect to decisions made from lower courts. Also, can supervise lower courts ensuring the law is interpreted accurately. (3)

Legal processes
Criminal actions commence with a police investigation which is transferred to the prosecutor's office within 48 hours of filing a complaint. The prosecutor will then hear and document statements from witnesses to determine if charges will be pressed or dropped, which must be completed 14 days from receiving the case from the police. Once the prosecutor has decided if charges will be pressed, the parties can proceed in hiring an attorney. All attorneys must be licensed to practice law and must be approved by an official deed notarized by a notary public to try the case. (3)

Trial procedures
Under the United Arab Emirates constitution all defendants are innocent until proven guilty. All trials are public except for national security cases trials that the honoring judge can rule to be conducted in privates if any evidence, testimonies or results are detrimental to societal morality. (4) Being that majority of the trials are public the emirs decided on having no juries in place in the courtroom. Also, all proceedings are delivered in the native language. Except the sentencing portion, translators are available for those who are not fluent in Arabic. For all indignant persons who are charged with felonies punishable by 3–15 years with no attorney, may have counsel provided for them upon the governments discretion. (4) Unlike the United States court system, the UAE prosecutors and defense lawyers have the ability to withhold any investigation from each other involving the case. (4) After, deliberations have been made of indictments, detainees may be released on bail informally. Authorities will accept a cash deposit, passport or an unsecured personal guarantee statement signed by a third party as a form of payment. Diya or blood money also qualifies as debt to a crime committed.

Diya or blood money
If one causes the death or injury of another person accidentally or intentionally he or she must pay the victim's family, what is known as diya or "blood money".  It is a means of compensation to the loss or harm for the loved ones. The payment of diya protects the rights of the family in the event of further threats from any accomplices or known associates of the defendant.  Diya is only payable if the defendant is found guilty under the criminal procedure or legally responsible for committing the crime. (5) However, if the defendant is found defending themselves, family, or property, diya will not be paid. Males rate of diya is Dh 200,000 (approx. US$54,450) and Dh 100,000 (approx. US$27,225) for females regardless of religion or nationality. (5)

Free trial and free press
Section 2 A of the United Arab Emirates constitution provides freedom of speech and press. However, the law prohibits criticism and slander of public officials that may create or encourage social uproar. (4) Journalists undergo strict boundaries implemented from the government. A variety of information can be published and distributed without the content being harmful or insulting to others. All sources must be reliable and will not be published until a full investigation has been performed to phish out any fabricated information. (6) Writers have the full right to document and publish info gathered from the courtroom due to trials being open to the public (judges can ask for privacy). Writers are prohibited from publishing the names of the accused, victims, or witnesses. (6)

Women and the law
Women in the UAE have progressed through the years with rights that they haven't had prior to the declaration. However, many are concerned with how women are treated in this country. In marriage, the women are bound by a marital contract that clearly states that she is to abide by her husband, take care of home and the children. If the women disobeys or neglect her duties as a wife, by law the husband has the right to use physical means including violence to correct her disdaining acts. (4) Nevertheless, some domestic abuse cases can be filed as an assault without the intent to kill that is punishable by 10 years in prison of death results, 7 years for permanent disability, or 1 year for temporary injury. (4) Rape in the UAE is not tolerated and is punishable by immediate death. However, many women do not report being raped because they could be accused of adultery which results in flogging or death by stoning and brings shame to the family. (7) Divorce is rare in the UAE due to the stipulations that derive from it. Article 110 of the Personal Status Code states, women can request to be divorced with the exception that she surrenders all of her finances; otherwise known as the "khul" divorce procedure. (7) If the divorce is processed, the custody of the children is determined. Women are considered to be physical guardians and only have the right to custody up to the age of 13 for girls and 10 for boys. Once that age has been reached the Sharia courts can reassess for further custody. If the woman decides to remarry she automatically forfeits her rights of custody for her children from the previous marriage. (7)

Juveniles and the law
Like the women if minors disobey or act out, the male has the right to utilize corporal punishment. Criminal responsibility begins at age seven. (8) Sharia principles permit corporal punishment of young children including flogging, amputation, and retaliation similar to the pain reflected on the victim. Article 8 of the Juvenile Delinquent and Vagrant Act states, that if a juvenile is over the age of 16 and commits an offence, under the Penal Code at the judge's discretion they may sentence them to the measures provided in crime, instead of the prescribed penalty. (9) Article 9 states, "a juvenile may not be condemned to capital punishment". Juveniles who reach 16 are to be punished under the penal code substituting a sentence of detention not to exceed 10 years. (10)

Customs and culture
It is apparent that the UAE has applied firm penalties in accordance with maintaining the country's respect. Its vast success from new contemporary ideas has inspired other countries to engage in the innovations. With respect to UAE's religion, any showing of body parts such as buttocks, leg breast is deemed indecent and is strictly prohibited. Punishment for indecent exposure if jail or deportation. The body and romantic relationship is sacred and affection should be kept behind closed doors. Public affection is not allowed regardless of relationship status. Kissing and embracing of significant others is offensive and will be reported; holding hands is only affection acceptable.

Crimes punishable by death
The death penalty's purpose is to not only punish, but to rehabilitate criminals and if possible prevent others from committing the same crime. (13) The main goal of the United Arab Emirates is to protect the lives, religion, parentage, intellect, and property of its citizens through rules and regulations that are strictly enforced with no tolerance. There are five crimes that the death penalty is automatically administered for: adultery, rape, armed highway robbery, murder, and apostasy.

In the Middle East, men are lawfully allowed to marry up to four women provided that he equally divides his time and money to take care of the family needs. (13) If the wives believe they haven't received their share of his time or expenses than they have the right to ask for a divorce, due to the lack of marital support. The concept of having multiple spouses is to discourage men from committing adultery, having any sexual intercourse outside of marriage. Basically to avoid any bastard children, this in turn can create confusion within the family. The child will not be considered to have a father because his mother was not legally married to him and places the child in a difficult position, psychologically. Adultery is forbidden in order to uphold is mission to protect the livelihood of its citizens.

Rape, is extremely unacceptable in this country. The age of sexual maturity is fourteen. (13) Both women and men can be considered the culprit. To be sentenced to the death penalty full intercourse must have occurred. (13) In contrast, it is difficult to prove based on the circumstances of how women are treated in the law. If a woman confesses that she has been attacked without consent she must immediately alert local authorities in order to assess the crime, if not she will be deemed as agreeing and being full fledge on in non-marital sex and sentenced to death. In addition, if a woman is pregnant at the time of her sentencing she is allowed to give birth and suckle the child for two years before her death is complete. (13)
Armed highway robbery is the impression of taking money from another under the threat of force of arms, thus imposing physical or financial assault. (13) Theft (Al Haraboh) occurs when an individual or group of people prey on others in attempt to take their valuables or property. Citizens have the natural right to obtain anything they have without the threat of someone without authority revoking it from them. The perpetrator who breaks that natural right is going against the ideologies of the country, which no pardon can be given.

Under Book 1, Article 1 of the Penal Code retributive penalties can apply under the Sharia law. The United Arab Emirates courts follow the Maliki School of Sunni Islam for the use of authority and interpretation from other schools to pronounce the sentences for murder cases. Islamic law defines any sane person who intentionally kills another with a weapon, is a sinner deserving perdition according to the Quran and the murderer is subject to retaliation. (11) Aggravated Murder, in the case of "deliberate design" or premeditated purpose is also punishable by death. (11) Unlawful killing such as: killing by fire, drowning in water, throwing from a high place, crushing by pushing down a wall, strangling, prevention of food and water, or exposing to a predatory animal are all likely to cause death, in the event death will be the punishment. (13) Homicides of public employees including ministries, government authorities, and members of the armed forces are considered an attack on the country itself and will be immediately prosecuted.

Apostasy or Al Reda is one who turns away from the Islamic religion, whether he or she embraces another religion or says they disbelieve after once believing. This crime is characterized and an intentional act unless under the individual is not at their sound capacity. (13) Any Muslim that denies one of the holy books, the prophets, or rejects any methods of the Islamic worship including prayer, paying Zakat (obligatory payment made annually under Islamic law on certain kinds of property and used for charitable and religious purpose), or fasting will be condemned to life for not abiding by the ordinances set in place for the country. (13) Moreover, if the person proclaims that they are in disbelief but is unaware of their statements they will be questioned once they regain their normal state of mind. Once they have gain clarity of themselves and deny any statements made in that stage than they will not be held liable for their action or comments. (13)

Other crimes that can be accountable for readmission for the death penalty are perjury/calumny, inciting suicide, drinking (the use of drug-induced state of mind to incite a person to commit an offense; drinking and driving results in jail, fines, and deportation, (12) arson, kidnapping, drug trafficking (severe crime with a zero tolerance policy toward illegal drug use) (12), and human trafficking.

All of these crimes have been committed but are infrequent due to the punishment of death. During the process of execution a deputy of the ministry, doctor, convict's lawyer and one of the member of the public prosecution are present. Relatives of the criminal are able to visit that day prior to the implementation of the sentence.

References

References:
(1)"The Story of the UAE." Zayed University, United Arab Emirates. N.p., n.d. Web. 23 Mar. 2014.

(2)Berg, Herbert (2005). "Islamic Law" Berkshire Encyclopedia of World History 3. Pg. 1030.

(3)"The UAE Court System." . N.p., n.d. Web. 18 Mar. 2014.

(4)United Arab Emirates. .N.p.,n.d. Web. 25 Mar. 2014.

(5)Al Jandaly, Bassma. "Blood Money In Islamic Law." Gulfnews.com. N.p., 20 Jan. 2009. Web 12 Apr. 2014.

(6)"Protection of News Sources in UAE." Free Trial and News Sources. N.p., n.d. Web. 12 Apr. 2014 

(7)"Women’s Rights in the UAE." International Federation of Human Rights. N.p., Jan. 2010. 

(8)Philippe, Marie. "Realizing  Children’s Rights in the United Arab Emirates." Humanium. N.p., 14 February 2013. Web. 25 March 2014 

(9)Juvenile Delinquent and Vagrant Act. Article 8. N.p., Web. 6 April 2014.

(10)"Inhuman Sentencing of Children in UAE." Child Rights International Network. N.p., Web 6 April 2014 

(11)"United Arab Emirates." Death Penalty Worldwide. N.p., 7 February 2011. Web. 25 March 2014. 

(12)"United Arab Emirates Crime and Safety Report: Abu Dhabi." OSAC. N.p., n.d. Web. 15 April 2013. 

(13)Abdulla, Saleh, and Mirad Abdulla. "The Use of the Death Penalty Under the Law of the United Arab Emirates." Diss. University of Aberystwyth, 2012. Print.

Legal systems
Law of the United Arab Emirates